Two ships of the Royal Navy have borne the name HMS Ceylon, after the former British colony of Ceylon, now Sri Lanka. Two ships taken up from trade were also named Ceylon:

She was renamed HMS Ceylon in 1808 , converted to a troopship in 1813, eventually being sold in 1857.
 was a  light cruiser launched in 1942. She was sold to Peru in 1960 and renamed Coronel Bolognesi until being decommissioned in 1982 and broken up in 1985.

Other ships
Ceylon was a tug hired as an armed boarding steamer between 1914 and 1919.
Ceylon was a private yacht requisitioned in 1915 and returned to her owners in 1916.

Royal Navy ship names